The Gillette Post Office in Gillette, Wyoming was built in 1935 by the Public Works Administration. The post office was one of the few monumental buildings in Gillette at the time and was a source of local pride. Designed by the Office of the Supervising Architect, the red brick building incorporates austere classical detailing. The front facade is two stories while the remainder of the building is one story. A full second story was not funded.

References

External links

Gillette Post Office at the Wyoming State Historic Preservation Office

Post office buildings on the National Register of Historic Places in Wyoming
Neoclassical architecture in Wyoming
Government buildings completed in 1935
Buildings and structures in Campbell County, Wyoming
New Deal in Wyoming
National Register of Historic Places in Campbell County, Wyoming
Gillette, Wyoming
Public Works Administration in Wyoming